Divya Nag (born c. 1991) is an American stem cell biologist, biotechnology entrepreneur, and a leader of Apple's Health and Research initiatives. At the age of 20, Nag co-founded Stem Cell Theranostics which uses patient-specific stem cells in a drug discovery platform. Nag is also the founder of StartX Med, Stanford University's healthcare accelerator program. At Apple, Nag leads a team designing tools that help ease communication between healthcare professionals, researchers, and patients to guide scientific innovation and improve health outcomes.

Early life and education 
Nag was born in California and grew up in El Dorado County. Her parents immigrated to the United States from Jaipur, India, before she was born. Nag's father, Harish Nag, is a software programmer at Intel, and he taught her from a young age to surround herself with people that are better than her.

Nag attended Rolling Hills Middle School where she was the student body president. At age 13, Nag she became the youngest student ever to enter Folsom Lake College. With a desire to learn more and better herself, Nag then pursued high school at Mira Loma High School in Sacramento where she could partake in the International Baccalaureate Program.

During her time at Mira Loma, Nag had a desire to work alongside scientists. She contacted many scientists at the University of California, Davis, and secured an internship as a high school student in the lab of Alexandra Navrotsky where she explored the use of nanoparticles in the prevention of forest fires, like the ones that were ravaging her hometown at the time. Her work elucidated that addition of quartz to soil would increase the temperature threshold for fires to start and now quartz is being added to prevent accidental fires in campgrounds.

Nag was accepted to Stanford University in 2009 and pursued her undergraduate degree in biomedical engineering and medical anthropology. She immediately started research in the lab of Joseph Wu studying stem cells, their induction, and their potential use in transplantation. She also explored various aspects of cardiovascular disease. Within one year she had dozens of publications and had begun to work alongside Wu and two other Stanford professors, Andrew S. Lee and Robert C. Robbins to create a drug testing platform where rapid assessment of the efficacy of drugs on human heart tissue could be tested to expedite both drug discovery and patient treatment. They founded the company Stem Cell Theranostics in 2011 to begin to put their ideas to use in the healthcare sphere. One year later, Nag founded StartX Med, a spin-off of the accelerator program StartX at Stanford in order to help students like herself begin the process of biotechnology innovation and healthcare entrepreneurship.

By 2012, Nag was heavily involved in both Stem Cell Theranostics and StartX Med so she decided to discontinue her studies at Stanford to lead her company and organization at the age of 20.

Career and research

Stem Cell Theranostics 
Nag co-founded Stem Cell Theranostics in 2011. Stem Cell Theranostics is a biotechnology company that pioneered the use of skin cell derived stem cells to use in drug discovery platforms. Specifically, they would take skin cells and convert them to stem cells and then re-differentiate them into heart cells through the addition of transcription factors. Since the heart cells, now being grown in a dish, are derived from a patient, they contain genetic profile and thus drugs can be tested in a patient specific manner. The motivation behind Nag's company lies in the fact that most drugs do not make it to the final stages of clinical trials due to cardiovascular effects and further, most drugs that are recalled after passing the final stages, are recalled due to negative effects on the cardiovascular system. Nag wanted a cheap and fast way to test the effects of a drug on human cells, instead of in mice, so speed up the drug discovery process and bring harmless and specific treatments to patients as quickly as possible. When they tested their technology on drugs that had been recalled due to cardiovascular effects, they found that their platform identified dangerous or harmful drugs 100% of the time.

StartX Med 
Nag founded StartX Med at Stanford University in 2012. StartX Med is an organization that supports students in their path towards innovating and developing healthcare based startup companies through Stanford. She was inspired by her own experiences starting Stem Cell Theranostics as she saw added hurdles in starting a healthcare startup compared to the typical technology startup that StartX supported. She wanted to help students navigate their way through finding laboratories and FDA approval as she had to for her company as well as create a collaborative environment for students interested in starting companies in the healthcare sector. StartX Med has now helped over 500 health technology companies, raised over $1 billion in aggregate, and partnered with top 10 pharmaceutical companies to bring ideas into practice.

Career at Apple 
In 2014, Nag was recruited to work at Apple in the Special Projects unit to innovate novel ways to make healthcare data easily usable by both patients and researchers. She leads a team that created ResearchKit, which is an app based tool that enables collection of health data from any user with a smartphone thus allowing researchers to broaden their subject and patient pools to expedite discovery and translation in medicine. The app allows doctors to alter patients to follow their prescribed treatment plans and also allows patients to provide updates to physicians. The app also allows patients to track their health and disease conditions in novel ways.

Awards and honors 

 2018 Time magazine Healthcare 50 List
 2017 Fortune 40 under 40
 2016 2nd Most Creative Person in Business by Fast Company
 2016 Silicon Valley Top 100 Innovators and Disruptors list by Business Insider
 2016 25 coolest women in Silicon Valley by Business Insider
 2014 Forbes 30 under 30 standout in Science & Healthcare
 2014 Business Insider Most Powerful Millennials under 35
 2011 American Heart Association Undergraduate Fellowship
 Stanford University Thought Leader

Select publications 

 Marco V. Perez, M.D., Kenneth W. Mahaffey, M.D., Haley Hedlin, Ph.D., John S. Rumsfeld, M.D., Ph.D., Ariadna Garcia, M.S., Todd Ferris, M.D., Vidhya Balasubramanian, M.S., Andrea M. Russo, M.D., Amol Rajmane, M.D., Lauren Cheung, M.D., Grace Hung, M.S., Justin Lee, M.P.H., Peter Kowey, M.D., Nisha Talati, M.B.A., Divya Nag, Santosh E. Gummidipundi, M.S., Alexis Beatty, M.D., M.A.S., Mellanie True Hills, B.S., Sumbul Desai, M.D., Christopher B. Granger, M.D., Manisha Desai, Ph.D., and Mintu P. Turakhia, M.D., M.A.S. for the Apple Heart Study InvestigatorsLarge-Scale Assessment of a Smartwatch to Identify Atrial Fibrillation. N Engl J Med 2019;381:1909-1917.
 Turakhia, Mintu & Desai, Manisha & Hedlin, Haley & Rajmane, Amol & Talati, Nisha & Ferris, Todd & Desai, Sumbul & Nag, Divya & Patel, Mithun & Kowey, Peter & Rumsfeld, John & Russo, Andrea & Hills, Mellanie & Granger, Christopher & Mahaffey, Kenneth & Perez, Marco. (2018). Rationale and design of a large-scale, app-based study to identify cardiac arrhythmias using a smartwatch: The Apple Heart Study. American Heart Journal. 207. 10.1016/j.ahj.2018.09.002.
 Nguyen P.K., Nag D., Wu J.C. (2012) Molecular Imaging of Cardiovascular Disease. In: Patterson C., Willis M. (eds) Translational Cardiology. Molecular and Translational Medicine. Humana Press, Totowa, NJ
 Nguyen, P.K., Nag, D. & Wu, J.C. Sex differences in the diagnostic evaluation of coronary artery disease. Journal of Nuclear Cardiology. 18, 144–152 (2011). https://doi.org/10.1007/s12350-010-9315-2
 Nguyen, Patricia & Nag, Divya & Wu, Joseph. (2010). Methods to Assess Stem Cell Lineage, Fate and Function. Advanced Drug Delivery Reviews. 62. 1175–86. 10.1016/j.addr.2010.08.008.

References

External links 
 

Living people
1990s births
Stanford University alumni
21st-century American biologists
Scientists from California
American people of Indian descent
Apple Inc. employees